Vlky is a village and municipality  in  Senec District in the Bratislava Region, in western Slovakia.

Geography
The municipality lies at an altitude of 128 metres and covers an area of 3.622 km2. It has a population of 428 people (2011).

History
In historical records the village was first mentioned in 1283.
After the Austro-Hungarian army disintegrated in November 1918, Czechoslovak troops occupied the area, later acknowledged internationally by the Treaty of Trianon. Between 1938 and 1945 Vlky once more  became part of Miklós Horthy's Hungary through the First Vienna Award. From 1945 until the Velvet Divorce, it was part of Czechoslovakia. Since then it has been part of Slovakia.

Demography
Population by nationality (2001):
Hungarian: 77,44%, Slovak:  21,05%

References

External links/Sources
 
https://web.archive.org/web/20051125052434/http://www.statistics.sk/mosmis/eng/run.html

Villages and municipalities in Senec District